Serbelloni is a surname. Notable people with the surname include:

Fabrizio Serbelloni (1695–1775), Italian diplomat and cardinal
Gabrio Serbelloni (1509–1580), Italian condottiero and general
Giovanni Antonio Serbelloni (1519–1591), Italian cardinal
Giovanni Galeazzo Serbelloni (1744–1802), Milanese nobleman